Oba Lake – North is a lake of the Algoma District in northern Ontario, Canada.  It is located on the northwestern border of the Chapleau Crown Game Preserve.

See also
List of lakes in Ontario

References
 National Resources Canada

Lakes of Algoma District